Warren County is a county located in the U.S. state of Georgia. As of the 2020 United States census, the population was 5,215, a decrease from 2010. The county seat is Warrenton. The county was created on December 19, 1793, and is named after General Joseph Warren, who was killed in the Battle of Bunker Hill.

Geography

The north-to-northeastern quarter of Warren County, north of a line between the county's northwestern corner, Norwood, and Camak, is located in the Little River sub-basin of the Savannah River basin. The southeastern quarter, from Camak in the north, and bordered by a northwest-to-southeast line running through Warrenton, is located in the Brier Creek sub-basin of the larger Savannah River basin.  The western half of the county, west of Warrenton, is located in the Upper Ogeechee River sub-basin of the Ogeechee River basin.

Major highways

  Interstate 20
  U.S. Route 278
  U.S. Route 278 Bypass
  State Route 12
  State Route 12 Bypass
  State Route 16
  State Route 17
  State Route 17 Connector
  State Route 80
  State Route 80 Alternate
  State Route 123
  State Route 171
  State Route 223
  State Route 402 (unsigned designation for I-20)

Adjacent counties
 Wilkes County (north)
 McDuffie County (east)
 Glascock County (south)
 Jefferson County (southeast)
 Hancock County (southwest)
 Taliaferro County (northwest)

Demographics

2020 census

As of the 2020 United States census, there were 5,215 people, 2,244 households, and 1,456 families residing in the county.

2010 census
As of the 2010 United States Census, there were 5,834 people, 2,315 households, and 1,582 families living in the county. The racial makeup of the county was 61.7% black or African American, 36.9% white, 0.4% Asian, 0.2% American Indian, 0.2% from other races, and 0.6% from two or more races. Those of Hispanic or Latino origin made up 0.9% of the population. In terms of ancestry, 33.5% were American, and 6.3% were English.

Of the 2,315 households, 30.6% had children under the age of 18 living with them, 40.5% were married couples living together, 23.4% had a female householder with no husband present, 31.7% were non-families, and 28.3% of all households were made up of individuals. The average household size was 2.48 and the average family size was 3.05. The median age was 42.9 years.

The median income for a household in the county was $31,043 and the median income for a family was $36,925. Males had a median income of $33,349 versus $21,884 for females. The per capita income for the county was $15,987. About 20.5% of families and 25.7% of the population were below the poverty line, including 39.4% of those under age 18 and 22.0% of those age 65 or over.

2000 census
As of the census of 2000, there were 6,336 people, 2,435 households, and 1,692 families living in the county.  The population density was 22 people per square mile (9/km2).  There were 2,767 housing units at an average density of 10 per square mile (4/km2).  The racial makeup of the county was 59.47% Black or African American, 39.46% White, 0.17% Native American, 0.14% Asian, 0.30% from other races, and 0.46% from two or more races.  0.80% of the population were Hispanic or Latino of any race.

There were 2,435 households, out of which 30.60% had children under the age of 18 living with them, 42.10% were married couples living together, 22.10% had a female householder with no husband present, and 30.50% were non-families. 27.40% of all households were made up of individuals, and 12.60% had someone living alone who was 65 years of age or older.  The average household size was 2.55 and the average family size was 3.09.

In the county, the population was spread out, with 26.40% under the age of 18, 8.70% from 18 to 24, 25.50% from 25 to 44, 23.40% from 45 to 64, and 16.10% who were 65 years of age or older.  The median age was 38 years. For every 100 females there were 86.40 males.  For every 100 females age 18 and over, there were 79.90 males.

The median income for a household in the county was $27,366, and the median income for a family was $32,868. Males had a median income of $28,177 versus $20,082 for females. The per capita income for the county was $14,022.  About 24.10% of families and 27.00% of the population were below the poverty line, including 36.00% of those under age 18 and 27.50% of those age 65 or over.

Communities
 Cadley
 Camak
 Jewell
 Mesena
 Norwood
 Warrenton (county seat)

Politics

See also

 Central Savannah River Area
 National Register of Historic Places listings in Warren County, Georgia
List of counties in Georgia

References

External links
 Warren County, Georgia, Chamber of Commerce

 
Georgia (U.S. state) counties
1793 establishments in Georgia (U.S. state)
Populated places established in 1793
Black Belt (U.S. region)
Majority-minority counties in Georgia